Antônio "Toninho" Fernandes Quintino (born February 27, 1952 in Florianópolis, Brazil) is a former Brazilian footballer who played for clubs in Brazil and Chile.

Career
Born in Florianópolis, Toninho Quintino began playing football with local side Avaí Futebol Clube. He won the Santa Caterina state championship twice with Avaí, but gained fame with Sociedade Esportiva Palmeiras where he won the 1976 Campeonato Paulista.

Teams
  Avaí 1972-1975
  Figueirense 1975
  Palmeiras 1976-1979
  Cruzeiro 1979-1980
  Corinthians 1981
  Universidad Católica 1981-1982
  Ponte Preta 1983
  Ferroviária 1983
  Avaí 1984-1986
  XV de Piracicaba 1987
  Aimoré 1987

References

External links
 Profile at terceirotempo Profile at

1952 births
Living people
Brazilian footballers
Brazilian expatriate footballers
Brazil international footballers
Campeonato Brasileiro Série A players
Avaí FC players
Figueirense FC players
Sociedade Esportiva Palmeiras players
Cruzeiro Esporte Clube players
Sport Club Corinthians Paulista players
Club Deportivo Universidad Católica footballers
Associação Atlética Ponte Preta players
Associação Ferroviária de Esportes players
Esporte Clube XV de Novembro (Piracicaba) players
Expatriate footballers in Chile
Brazilian expatriate sportspeople in Chile
Association footballers not categorized by position
Sportspeople from Florianópolis